is the first Japanese sprinter to win a medal in a track event at a World Competition. Current Japanese record holder for Men’s 400 meter hurdle (as of July 2021).
Bronze medalist of the 2001 World Championships in Edmonton and 2005 World Championships in Athletics in Helsinki.

Tamesue represented Japan in the Sydney, Athens, and Beijing Olympics.  He started running professionally in 2003 and retired after 25 years of competitive athletics in 2012.

Pursuing ways to pass on the benefits of sports into society through associate organizations; Samurai Co., Ltd. (Representative Director), Athlete Society (Representative Director, Founded 2010),  Xiborg (Founded 2014 ).

Assigned to Bhutan’s Olympic Committee (BOC) ambassador in April 2015.  Continues to support countries that are limited in Olympic medal experiences.

Other assignments include;
Specially assigned researcher for the Research Center for Advanced Science and Technology in Tokyo University (2014)
Member of the evaluation committee for the New National Stadium reconstruction planning procedure of the Ministry of Education, Culture, Sports, Science and Technology (2015)
Sports Legacy Project management committee member for the Tokyo Marathon Foundation.

Achievements

References
Unitar.org

External links
 

1978 births
Living people
Sportspeople from Hiroshima
Japanese male hurdlers
Olympic male hurdlers
Olympic athletes of Japan
Athletes (track and field) at the 2000 Summer Olympics
Athletes (track and field) at the 2004 Summer Olympics
Athletes (track and field) at the 2008 Summer Olympics
Asian Games bronze medalists for Japan
Asian Games medalists in athletics (track and field)
Athletes (track and field) at the 2002 Asian Games
Medalists at the 2002 Asian Games
World Athletics Championships medalists
Japan Championships in Athletics winners